20th Anniversary Tour 2004 is a DVD release of music videos by the band KMFDM.

Track listing

Disc one: feature presentation

Live videos

FanKam videos

Extras
Band and director's commentary for live videos
Making of FanKam featurette

Disc two: Bonus material
KMFDM on the road and overseas (behind the scenes footage from the 20th Anniversary Tour, including band and crew interviews)
Animated tour photos/Fan photos slide-show
Lucia's tour journal
20th Anniversary World Tour dates
20th Anniversary World Tour set list
Lyrics for songs on disc one (including English translation of Liebeslied)
Band member bios
Original internet teaser
Original internet trailer
KMFDM photo wallpapers for computer desktops

All disc two features are also included as computer-accessible ROM content except the photo slide-show.

Personnel
Sascha Konietzko – vocals, percussion, keyboards
Lucia Cifarelli – vocals, keyboards
Jules Hodgson – guitar
Andy Selway – drums
Steve White – guitar

KMFDM video albums
2004 video albums
Live video albums
2004 live albums
KMFDM compilation albums
KMFDM live albums
Music video compilation albums